Diane Lamein (born 18 October 1979, in Amsterdam) is a Dutch team handball player. She plays on the Dutch national team, and participated at the 2011 World Women's Handball Championship in Brazil.

References

External links 
 

1979 births
Living people
Dutch female handball players
Sportspeople from Amsterdam
21st-century Dutch women